Old Acquaintance is a 1943 American drama film released by Warner Bros. It was directed by Vincent Sherman and produced by Henry Blanke with Jack L. Warner as executive producer. The screenplay by John Van Druten, Lenore Coffee and Edmund Goulding was based on Van Druten's 1940 play of the same title.

The film stars Bette Davis, Miriam Hopkins, Gig Young, John Loder, Dolores Moran, Roscoe Karns and Anne Revere.

Background
The John Van Druten play upon which the film is based premiered at the Morosco Theatre in New York City on December 23, 1940 before running for 170 performances. The play was staged by Auriol Lee and designed by Richard Whorf, and it starred Jane Cowl, Peggy Wood and Kent Smith.

Bette Davis wanted Norma Shearer to take the role of Millie, but Shearer, who was semi-retired, declined to take the secondary role and second billing. Miriam Hopkins, who had starred in The Old Maid with Davis and had endured a difficult working relationship with her (Davis allegedly had an affair with Hopkins' husband Anatole Litvak), accepted the role.

Plot

In 1924, newly successful author Kit Marlowe returns to her hometown to speak, as part of a lecture tour, and to visit her dear childhood friend Millie. The friends have formed distinctly opposite personalities: Kit is witty, perceptive, wry and calmer, while Millie is intense, self-involved and histrionic. Millie has married Preston Drake and is pregnant, and she surprises Kit when she discloses she has also written a book, a romance novel. Millie asks Kit to present her book to her publisher. Upon their meeting, Preston appears to be impressed by Kit Marlowe.

Eight years pass, and Millie has become increasingly difficult and resentful of any diversion from full attention being focused upon herself. When Kit jokes and glowingly reports about her shopping trip with Preston and Millie's only child, Deirdre, Millie impudently retorts "Time you had one of your own!" as she swans out.

Preston immediately asks Kit why she has remained so loyal to Millie over the years. Kit confides in Preston despite Millie's often emotionally unstable and dysfunctional behavior, she feels indebted as Millie was her first real friend. Kit feels a particular loyalty to Millie as orphaned Kit grew up with an aunt who died and found a sense of home and family through Millie's parents' kindness and generosity towards Kit.

Millie has become a very successful writer, with a string of romance novels. This has made her very arrogant and condescending to those around her. Visiting New York, on the eve of the opening of a play written by Kit, the Drakes' marriage is slowly disintegrating. In an interview with a reporter, Preston, an architect and engineer, is shown to feel secondary to his wife’s success. In a private moment with Kit, when Millie mentions Preston’s drinking habit, Kit replies “people drink for escape,” but Millie does not seem to appreciate Kit’s point. In a private moment between Preston and Kit, he professes his love for her. Millie and Preston clash with Kit playing referee. The response is complete ingratitude from self-absorbed Millie and growing romantic feelings from an increasingly frustrated Preston.

Moments later, as the three converse, Preston and Millie's argument escalates (with Millie displaying what some might interpret as ‘manic’ behavior) and Preston leaves Millie ‘for good’. Kit tracks down Preston and tries to convince him to return to Millie, but he tries to convince Kit that he is in love with her. Selflessly, Kit tells him she can not reciprocate, as she could not do that to Millie. They kiss goodbye and part.

Ten years pass, and World War Two is underway. Kit is on a radio show espousing the good of the American Red Cross, and Preston, now a major in the Army, hears her. He calls the radio station to suggest they meet for a drink. They do, but Kit also has her much-younger beau, Rudd Kendall, and Preston’s almost 18-year-old daughter, Deirdre, whom Preston has not seen in those ten years, join them. Preston tells Kit he is engaged, and Kit is happy for him. Preston and his daughter become reacquainted. The next morning Rudd (again) presses Kit to marry him, but she puts him off, promising an answer in a few days, and he leaves. Rudd, feeling reproached and rejected, then meets with Deirdre.

Millie treats Preston's return as a victory and sets the scene for a desperate reconciliation. Preston however dashes her hopes by revealing his engagement and asks for ‘joint custody’ of Deirdre. Preston incidentally discloses to Millie that he was once in love with Kit. An outraged Millie throws him out. Millie then rants and raves to Deirdre about how Kit is a Jezebel (the writer's tongue-in-cheek reference to Davis’s 1938 film Jezebel). Millie spitefully does her best to poison Deirdre against Kit and relishes in excessively establishing herself as the center of attention and reveling in her self-indulgence, oblivious to Deirdre's clear distress.

Millie also discloses that Kit is to marry Rudd, causing Deirdre further distress, and Deirdre leaves. Kit and Millie have an all-out argument about all that hasn’t been said until now, where Millie acts victimized and Kit reveals a few brutal home truths to an in denial and melodramatic Millie. Millie even goes as far to discard to her own daughter to her love rival. Realizing her words are falling on deafened ears, frustrated Kit physically shakes Millie to "knock some sense" into her self-obsessed friend in arguably the film's most remembered scene.

That night, Kit, having decided to marry Rudd, finds out from him that he is now in love with Deirdre. Kit tracks down Deirdre at a handsome but incompatible beau's bachelor pad, calms her, and returns her to Rudd. Kit then returns home to find Millie, and they reconcile. Millie tells Kit about her new book, about the trials of two women friends, and Kit suggests that Millie title the book “Old Acquaintance”. Millie agrees.

Cast
 Bette Davis as Kit Marlowe
 Miriam Hopkins as Millie Drake
 Gig Young as Rudd Kendall
 John Loder as Preston Drake
 Dolores Moran as Deirdre Drake
 Phillip Reed as Lucian Grant
 Roscoe Karns as Charlie Archer
 Anne Revere as Belle Carter (credited as Ann Revere)
 Esther Dale as Harriet
 Frank Mayo as Army Officer (uncredited) 
 Jack Mower as Army Officer (uncredited) 
 Francine Rufo as Deirdre as a child (uncredited)

Reception
According to Warner Bros. records, the film earned $2,279,000 domestically and $1,360,000 in foreign markets.

Bosley Crowther, a film reviewer for The New York Times, found the friendship between the two lead characters implausible. "As a consequence," he wrote, "we have the tedious spectacle in this overdressed, overstuffed film of a supposedly intelligent woman writer spending her life being loyal to a girlhood friend who mints a fortune with trashy fiction and is vain, selfish, jealous and false to her."

Notes
 The film was remade in 1981 as Rich and Famous with Jacqueline Bisset and Candice Bergen.
 When Bette Davis wore her husband's pajama top as a nightie in the film it caused a fashion revolution, with I. Magnin selling out of men’s sleepwear the morning after the movie opened, and all of it to young women.

References

External links

 
 
 
 
 Old Acquaintance on Lux Radio Theater: May 29, 1944

American comedy-drama films
Warner Bros. films
1940s English-language films
American black-and-white films
1943 films
Films scored by Franz Waxman
American films based on plays
Films directed by Vincent Sherman
1943 comedy-drama films
Films produced by Henry Blanke
American female buddy films
Films about writers
1940s American films